Federbrau was a women's volleyball club, based in Bangkok, Thailand. The club played in the Thailand Volleyball Championship Serie A, which started in 2006.

History
The team won the 2009 Asian Club Championship, after defeating Tianjin Bridgestone at the final game. Onuma Sittirak won the MVP and Best Spiker award, Nootsara Tomkom Best Server and Wanna Buakaew Best Libero.

In the 2010 Asian Club Championship the team successfully retained the crown against Zhetysu Almaty from Kazakhstan. Nootsara Tomkom won the MVP award and Sittirak winning the Best Scorer and Best Spiker awards for Federbrau.

As the winner of the Asian Volleyball Confederation club tournament, the team earned the right to play at the 2010 FIVB Women's Club World Championship.

Squads
As of 2012 Asian Club Championship

Current
As of December 2010
 Head Coach:  Kiattipong Radchatagriengkai
 Assistant coach:  Nataphon Srisamutnak

Competition history

AVC Club Championships 
 2006 -  3rd place
 2007 -  Champion
 2008 -  Champion
 2009 -  Champion
 2010 -  Champion
 2011 -  Champion
 2012 -  3rd place

FIVB Volleyball Women's Club World Championship 
 2010 — 5th place
 2011 — 5th place

References 

Volleyball clubs in Thailand
Volleyball clubs established in 2008
Sports clubs disestablished in 2012